The 1974 Wayne State Tartars football team represented Wayne State University as an independent during the 1974 NCAA Division II football season. In their first year under head coach Dick Lowry, the Tartars compiled a 7–3 record.

Schedule

See also
 1974 in Michigan

References

Wayne State
Wayne State Warriors football seasons
Wayne State Tartars football